William Cannon (11 September 1871 – 29 April 1933) was an Australian cricketer. He played seven first-class cricket matches for Victoria between 1912 and 1914.

See also
 List of Victoria first-class cricketers

References

External links
 

1871 births
1933 deaths
Australian cricketers
Victoria cricketers
Sportspeople from Bendigo